Alexander Brown Pritchard was a politician in Queensland, Australia. He was a member of the Queensland Legislative Assembly. He was elected into that position in 1867 and died in 1898.

References

Bibliography

Members of the Queensland Legislative Assembly
1898 deaths
1825 births
19th-century Australian politicians